Past Life is an American crime drama fantasy television series which aired on Fox from February 9 to June 4, 2010. The series premiered on Tuesday, February 9 at 9:00 pm Eastern/8:00 pm Central. After the premiere, subsequent airings were broadcast on Thursdays beginning February 11, during the 9:00 pm Eastern/8:00 pm Central timeslot.

Cast

Kelli Giddish as Dr. Kate McGinn
Nicholas Bishop as Price Whatley
Richard Schiff as Dr. Malachi Talmadge
Ravi Patel as Dr. Rishi Karna

Production

The series was created by David Hudgins and inspired by the 2007 book The Reincarnationist, a crime thriller by M. J. Rose, whose main character, Josh Ryder, solves a 21st-century crime with memories and clues from his past life in ancient Rome.

Although seven episodes were produced, the series was canceled after three episodes aired due to rapidly declining ratings. The network announced plans to air the remaining episodes on successive Friday nights from May 28 to June 4, 2010. On June 8, Fox announced that they would not air the final two episodes.

Episodes

International broadcast

In the Netherlands the series aired with Human Target on RTL 5 every Thursday. In Portugal the series aired on Fox Life Portugal throughout July and August 2010. In Spain the series aired on laSexta every Sunday until the episode "All Fall Down". In Italy the series aired on Rai 2 starting from Sunday, January 9, 2011. In Croatia the series aired on Doma TV starting from Friday, June 16, 2011. In Bulgaria the series aired on bTV Cinema starting from September 8, 2012 at 20:00.

References

External links
Past Life official website at FOX.com

Past Life Info Archive

2010 American television series debuts
2010 American television series endings
2010s American crime drama television series
Fox Broadcasting Company original programming
2010s American medical television series
Television shows based on American novels
Television series by Warner Bros. Television Studios